The 2016 Alabama A&M Bulldogs football team represented Alabama Agricultural and Mechanical University in the 2016 NCAA Division I FCS football season. The Bulldogs were led by third-year head coach James Spady and played their home games at Louis Crews Stadium. They were a member of the East Division of the Southwestern Athletic Conference. They finished the season 4–7, 4–5 in SWAC play to finish in second place in the East Division.

Schedule

Source: Schedule

References

Alabama AandM
Alabama AandM Bulldogs football team
Alabama A&M Bulldogs football seasons